is part of the Musha Gundam series.

The events of this new work happened a one-year after the previous work.
Running period, 1993 to 1994.

Outline
This is the last chapter of SD Musha Gundam Fuuunroku, the Comic Bom Bom version. The next and future works run under their own title and is drawn by Kanda Masahiro.

The chapter feature continued appearance of the characters from the previous work. The plamo kits of this chapter provides parts for the kits of the previous chapter to update them to their appearance for this chapter, therefore strengthening the relation between the two chapters. The chapter too feature crossover characters from SD Gundam Gaiden and SD Command Senki.

Characters this time are based mostly on the mobile weapons from Mobile Suit Gundam F90, Mobile Suit Gundam F91 and Mobile Suit Gundam Silhouette Formula 91.

Story 
During his training on Mount Anaheim, Gouten received the Armours of the Sanresshin from the Crystal Phoenix. Two years have passed since then, a dark cloud appeared above the skies of Birmingham Town (破悪民我夢の街) from there appeared the New Dark Army. Kyuujuuichi, Ryuusei and Gekkou, donning the Sanresshin armours managed to suppress them. Gouten then sent the three to Mount Anaheim. During the journey they found the Kouou Bow (光凰の弓) and Shouryuu Arrow (昇龍の矢) which when shot at the Phoenix Boulder call upon the Crystal Phoenix. Rekkou is then chosen by the Crystal Phoenix to be the new Daishougun. Shinsei Daishougun then defeated Yami Teiou and brought peace to Ark once more.

Characters

Ark

Sanresshin (三烈神)
Eifu Kyuujuuichi/ Rekkou Gundam/ Shinsei Daishougun (衛府弓銃壱/烈光頑駄無/新世大将軍)
Design basis: Gundam F-91
Went into training after the events in Chijou Saikyou Hen. Created his own set of kenpou, Kenseiken(剣勢拳). Changed his name to Rekkou Gundam after receiving the Armour of Rekko(烈光の鎧) from Gouten Gundam and became one of the Sanresshin. The new armor enables Rekkou to use Ice and Fire attacks. Usually he equips the Armour of Touha(闘破の鎧). Developed a dislike for snakes after the Tenka Touitsu battle. Modelled after Miyamoto Musashi.
Became Shinsei Daishougun after he was chosen by the Crystal Phoenix(結晶鳳凰). When in Jinbaou Mode(神馬凰形態), he is able to use his strongest weapon Taiyo Hou(太陽砲).

Ryuusei Gundam/ Rekkuu Gundam (流星頑駄無/烈空頑駄無)
Design basis: Neo Gundam
Met Kyuujuuichi during his trainings and the two trained together. Changed his name to Rekkuu after receiving the Armour of Rekku(烈空の鎧). The new armour enables Rekkuu flight and aerial movement. A hardworking, optimistic swordsman with a strong sense of justice. Usually equips the Armour of Kensei(剣聖の鎧). Modelled after Sasaki Kojirō.

Gekkou Gundam/Reppa Gundam (月光頑駄無/烈破頑駄無)
Design basis: Silhouette Gundam
One of the 144th generation of disciples from Zaku Unsai's ninja training center. He serve under Gouten after graduating from the center. With the command from Gouten, he found Kyuujuuichi and Ryuusei, who were training at Mount Lavienrose(羅美安薔薇山), and brought them back to him. Became Reppa after receiving the Armour of Reppa(烈破の鎧) from Gouten. The new armor enables Reppa to use witchcraft. Usually a calm and collected person unless alcohol is consumed. Usually equips the Armour of Ninbu(忍武の鎧). Modelled after Yagyū Hyōgonosuke.

Gouten Gundam (轟天頑駄無)
Design basis: Prototype Gundam
The warrior that governs Ark in the absence of a Daishougun. He coordinates and participate actively in the reconstruction of Ark after the damages caused by Orochi Bygzam in Tenka Touitsu Hen. Given the Armours of the Sanresshin by the Crystal Phoenix. He was told by it to entrust them to Eifu Kyuujuuichi, Ryuusei and Gekkou and to tell them to go to Mount Anaheim.

Hyakushiki of the Pinwheel (風車の百式)
Design basis: Hyaku Shiki
A 144th generation disciple of Zaku Unsai like Gekkou. Uses shuriken shaped like flower pinwheel. He can be quite capable when the mood comes.

Ukkari Zakurero (うっかりざくれろ)
Design basis: Zakrello
144th generation disciple of Zaku Unsai like Gekkou and Hyakushiki. Together with Hyakushiki, they are drop-outs put to a journey of perpetual training by Zaku Unsai. During the journey they were attacked but Kyuujuuichi came to their rescue so now Zakurero address Kyuujuuichi as "aniki"(big brother). Is a glutton and has a large appetite for dango.

Raijin Gundam (雷刃頑駄無)
Design basis: Heavy Gundam
Heavy Gundam after he came back from his training in Abram. Gains the ability to use Lightning Arts with the Raijin jingi.

Fuujin Gundam (風刃頑駄無)
Design basis: Full Armour Gundam
Fullarmour Gundam after he came back from his training in Albion. Gains the ability to use Wind Arts with the Fuujin jingi.

Musha Gunsaber (武者頑星刃)
Design basis: Gunsavior Z
Warrior from another world(SD Command World). His real name is Gunsavior Z, he suffered memory lost from the shock when he was called to this world. Able to change to flight mode and skilled in using the bow and spear.
He was summoned to the musha world by the Crystal Phoenix. After he obtained the Kouou Bow and Shouryuu Arrow to awaken the Crystal Phoenix, he went back to his world.

Gundam Mark Three/ Mark Three Daishougun (頑駄無真駆参/真駆参大将軍)
Design basis: Gundam Mk-III/ Superior Dragon
Descendant of Musha Mark Three. A reckless and unbelieving person. At one time became the Daishougun on fusion with the Crystal Phoenix. When he was Mark Three Daishougun he saw Rekkou and the others desperately fighting the attack of the New Dark Army and he realised that power is not everything. He returned the power with a new resolve to fight the New Dark Army. Able to change to Blaster Kentauros Form(爆走四脚体型).
In the Bom Bom version, Mark Three is the form taken by Superior Dragon (guardian god of the Saddarc World) to return the Platina Shield(白鋼の盾). He entrusted the power of the Daishougun to Rekkou as he has the mission to protect the Saddarc World.

Abram
Gundam Hakuryuu Taitei (頑駄無白龍大帝)
Design basis: Gundam GP-01Fb
Now the ruler of Abram, he has succeed the Armour of Ryuutei(龍帝の鎧) of the Ryuukihou(龍輝宝). With it he gain the ability to control weather. Favored by the citizens as the second coming of the Ryuutei, he is respectfully referred as Hakuryuu Taitei. Together with Souryuu and Kouryuu, they went to Ark to help with the crisis.

Souryuu Gundam (蒼龍頑駄無)
Design basis: Gundam GP-02
Seiryuu's new form after he succeeds a part of the Ryuukihou - Ryuuga no Kou(龍牙の甲). With it he gain immerse strength.

Kouryuu Gundam (紅龍頑駄無)
Design basis: Red Warrior
Sekiryuu's new form after he succeeds a part of the Ryuukihou - Ryuubi no Kou(龍尾の甲). With it he is able to better pinpoint the position of enemies and it also enhances his specialty Fire Arts.

Albion
Gundam Ashuraou (頑駄無阿修羅王)
Design basis: Gundam F-90
Succeeding his father, Ashura Gundam is now the ruler of Albion. He has inherited the Kimen(鬼面) of the Kimaira statue(鬼舞虎の像) and with it many skills and techniques. Political matters has been entrusted to Shouha while he trains with Asuka. Ashuraou with Asuka and Shouha rushed to Ark to help out on receiving news on the crisis.

Asuka Gundam (飛鳥頑駄無)
Design basis: Gundam F-90II
Neou Gundam's new form after receiving the Choumen(鳥面) of the Kimaira statue. With it he gain the ability of flight and aerial movement. Has been busy training.

Shouha Gundam (翔破頑駄無)
Design basis: Gundam Mk-V
Shiranui Gundam's new form after receiving the Juumen(獣面) of the Kimaira statue. With it he gain supreme ground maneuvering. He has been taking care of the political matters for Ashuraou who is in training with his brother.

New Dark Army (新生闇軍団)
Yami Teiou (闇帝王)
Design basis: Neue Ziel
The personification of darkness and mastermind of the New Dark Army who is revived by Mazaku. Changing to his Evil Beast form, he gave the warriors of Ark a hard time.

Mazaku (魔殺駆)
The dark general of the New Dark Army. He aims to revive the Yami Teiou. Will be a recurring villain in the upcoming chapters.

Enma Ningun (炎魔忍軍)
Zera (漸羅)
Design basis: Vigna Zirah
The leader of the Enma Ningun.

Hyouma Ningun (氷魔忍軍)
Gebera (華紅羅)
Design basis: Gerbera Tetra
Leader of the Hyouma Ningun.

Youma Ningun (妖魔忍軍)
Valvaro (刃流刃浪)
Design basis: Val Varo
Leader of the Youma Ningun.

Kuuma Ningun (空魔忍軍)
Balus (羽流鋭)
Design basis: Berga Balus
Leader of the Kuuma Ningun.

Glossary
Sanresshin (三烈神)
The ones who received the Armours of the Sanresshin. Later on in Shin SD Sengokuden Chou Kidou Daishougun Hen, Victory, Blade and Bird come to be known as the New Sanresshin.

New Dark Army (新生闇軍団)
Motif: Delaz Fleet, Crossbone Vanguard
The army formed by Mazaku with the power from Yami Teiou. Forming the bulk are the zombie mushas which are revived by Yami Teiou then the flame users Enma Ningun, ice users Hyouma Ningun, the Youma Ningun consisting of witchcraft users and monsters and the ones capable of flight in the Kuuma Ningun.

Game
Shin SD Sengokuden Daishougun Retsuden (Super Famicom)
A realtime SLG with Densetsu no Daishougun Hen as the main story and special scenarios with the characters from the first 3 works and the next work.

SD Gundam